The General Transport, Petroleum and Chemical Workers' Union (GTPCWU) is a trade union representing workers in various industries in Ghana.

The union was founded in 1967 in Accra, to represent workers in the formal section of road transport, in air transport, and in the chemical and petroleum sectors.  By 1985, membership had reached 29,185, but by 2018 this had fallen to 7,500.

References

Transportation trade unions
Trade unions established in 1967
Trade unions in Ghana
Chemical industry trade unions